The Dayton-Wright KT Cabin Cruiser was a 1920s American three-seat touring aircraft built by the Dayton-Wright Airplane Company in Dayton, Ohio. Often known as the "Honeymoon Express", it was one of several civilian aircraft the company developed from the de Havilland DH.4.

Design and development
The Dayton-Wright Airplane Company had built 3,106 de Havilland DH.4s under license during the First World War.  After the war ended, the company looked to develop civil transports. The resulting KT Cabin Cruiser was a standard production DH.4 with a glazed enclosure for two passengers in tandem-seat configuration in the front, and a pilot in the rear, under a continuous glazed canopy. Because of the intimate side-by-side accommodations for the front passengers the aircraft was popularly known as the "Honeymoon Express". Another more basic conversion from the DH.4 was the Nine-Hour Cruiser which retained the open cockpit with room for two passengers behind, but had an increased fuel load.

Specifications (KT Cabin Cruiser)

See also

References

Notes

Bibliography

 

1920s United States civil utility aircraft
Cabin Cruiser
Biplanes
Single-engined tractor aircraft
Aircraft first flown in 1921